Anorthosis Famagusta F.C. is one of the most successful football clubs in Cyprus. The club was established in 1911, but the football department was only formed in 1929. They joined the Cyprus Football Association in 1934 as a founding member, but due to financial difficulties they ceased operation of the football team in 1937. The football team was reformed in 1945 and has been in existence since then. The list of managers is currently incomplete.

Managers

Notes

References 

Anorthosis Famagusta F.C.
 List
Association football in Cyprus lists